Jaime Santiago Villalongo (born 17 September 1942) is a Puerto Rican former sports shooter. He competed in the 50 metre rifle, prone event at the 1972 Summer Olympics.

References

External links
 

1942 births
Living people
Puerto Rican male sport shooters
Olympic shooters of Puerto Rico
Shooters at the 1972 Summer Olympics
Sportspeople from Ponce, Puerto Rico